Vibble is a locality in Västerhejde on the Swedish island of Gotland. Sweden with 1,300 inhabitants in 2010. The main business in Vibble is tourism. The relocated original Villa Villekulla - where Pippi Longstocking lived - is at the Kneippbyn Holiday Resort in Vibble.

, Vibble Chapel belongs to Stenkumla parish, along with the churches in Stenkumla, Träkumla and Västerhejde.

Gallery

References

External links 

Populated places in Gotland County